A cheongsachorong is a traditional Korean lantern. It is typically made by joining red and blue silk shades and hanging a candle inside the body. Although used historically in wedding ceremonies, it is widely displayed in various cultural exhibitions today in South Korea.

A stylized cheongsachorong has been featured as the logo of the 2010 G-20 Seoul summit.

References
『고려도경(高麗圖經)』

『만기요람(萬機要覽)』

『사례변람(四禮便覽)』

『성호사설(星湖僿說)』

Types of lamp